This is a list of Estonian football transfers in the winter transfer window 2013–14 by club. Only transfers in Meistriliiga are included.

Meistriliiga

Flora

In:

Out:

Infonet

In: 

Out:

Sillamäe Kalev

In: 

Out:

Tallinna Kalev

In: 

Out:

Nõmme Kalju

In: 

Out:

Levadia

In: 

Out:

Lokomotiv

In: 

Out:

Paide Linnameeskond

In: 

Out:

Tammeka

In: 

Out:

Narva Trans

In: 

Out:

See also
 2014 Meistriliiga
 2014 Esiliiga
 2014 Esiliiga B

References

External links
 Estonian Football Association

Estonian
transfers
transfers
2013–14